Rocky is a 2021 Indian Tamil language action crime film written and directed by debutant Arun Matheswaran. Produced by RA Studios and distributed by Rowdy Pictures. the film stars Vasanth Ravi, Bharathiraja and Raveena Ravi in the lead roles, and the music is composed by Darbuka Siva. 

The film released on 23 December 2021, and received positive reviews from critics, where it ran for 50 days and became a commercial success at the box office.

Plot 
Rocky is a hitman, who is released from prison where he learns that his sister Amutha has left the city and stays at his friend Mahalingam's house, where he enquires a gangster named Samy about Amutha, but to no avail. Mahalingam finds through Nadarajan that Amudha is in Sellur, which he informs to Rocky. Meanwhile, A flashback reveals that Rocky lived with his mother Malli and Amutha in Madras. He worked with a drug smuggler named Manimaran. Malli objected to Rocky's decision for working with Manimaran, as her husband (Rocky's father) had worked and lost his life working with Manimaran. Rocky heads to Sellur where he meets a pregnant Amutha, who berates him for his mistakes but reconciles with him. 

Suddenly, Manimaran's henchman, along with an Inspector arrive, where they knock Rocky and kill Amutha. Rocky awakens alongside Nadarajan, who learns about the incident. They reach the Inspector's hideout and brutally kill the Inspector and the henchmen. Rocky heads to Samy's lodge where he tortures Samy's assistant, who reveals Manimaran's location in an abandoned construction site in Meenjur, He also kills him afterwards. They reach the site only to fight with the goons resulting in Nadarajan being killed. Rocky kills most of the goons including Samy, where he confronts Manimaran, only to learn that they killed Amutha's husband. 

Amutha's daughter is the only lone survivor where she is held by Manimaran's right-hand Thanraj at knifepoint. Rocky escapes along with Amutha's daughter after knocking Manimaran and Thanraj where they leave for Malli's village in Tamil Eelam. It is revealed again in a flashback that Rocky killed Manimaran's son when Manimaran's son was jealous of Rocky who took over the consignment and was berated by Manimaran, due to which Manimaran's son killed Malli. During the journey, Rocky learns about his niece name: Malli, who was named after Malli and a bond grows between them. 

Thanraj kills Mahalingam and traces Rocky and Malli in Dhanushkodi, where he tries to kill him, but Rocky kills him by stabbing his eyes with a sharp object and kills the remaining henchmen. While reaching Dhanushkodi, Rocky faces Manimaran and the entire criminal fraternity of Madras where he kills all of them using a M134 Minigun, which was actually a part of the consignment secretly kept by Rocky. With no one else to trouble him as Manimaran committed suicide, Rocky along with Malli leaves on a boat en route to Malli's village, where Malli ask Rocky that if she could tell a story about an eagle.

Cast 
 Vasanth Ravi as Rocky
 Bharathiraja as Manimaran
 Raveena Ravi as Amudha
 Rohini as Malli
 Poo Ram as Mahalingam
Ravi Venkataraman as Samy
Ashraf Mallisery as Thanraj
Rishikanth as Manimaran's son
Jayakumar as Nadarajan
Anisha as Malli and childhood Amudha

Music
The soundtrack and score was composed by Darbuka Siva and the album featured three songs. The audio rights were acquired by Lahari Music.

Reception

Critical reception 
Rocky received critical acclaim from critics and audience, who praised the cast performances (particularly Ravi and Bharathiraja), action sequences, direction, narrative style and technical aspects.

Ashameera Aiyappan of Firstpost rated the film with 4 out of 5 stating that, "With Rocky, Director Arun Matheswaran and DOP Shreyas Krishnaa manipulate the space on-screen with great finesse to communicate the emotional psyche of the characters." Suganth of The Times of India gave a rating of 4 out of 5 and wrote, "Rocky is gloriously violent and deeply sentimental". Manoj Kumar of Indian Express gave a rating of 3.5 out of 5 and wrote, "None before Arun Matheswaran had dared to graphically depict violence in such a way. The film's setup innately compromises the separation between good versus evil. It is a demon versus demon and we have to root for the lesser evil." Janani of India Today rated the film with 3 out of 5 stating that, "Rocky is a leaf out of the John Wick universe, but Indian style."

References

External links 
 

Indian gangster films
2021 action films